Psechrus is a genus of cribellate araneomorph spiders in the family Psechridae, and was first described by Tamerlan Thorell in 1878.

Species
 it contains fifty-seven species, found only in Asia and Queensland:
P. aluco Bayer, 2012 – Indonesia (Java)
P. ampullaceus Bayer, 2014 – Vietnam
P. ancoralis Bayer & Jäger, 2010 – Laos, Thailand
P. annulatus Kulczyński, 1908 – Indonesia (Java)
P. antraeus Bayer & Jäger, 2010 – Laos
P. arcuatus Bayer, 2012 – Indonesia (Sumatra)
P. argentatus (Doleschall, 1857) (type) – Indonesia (Sulawesi) to Australia (Queensland)
P. arietinus Bayer, 2014 – Vietnam
P. borneo Levi, 1982 – Borneo
P. cebu Murphy, 1986 – Philippines
P. changminae Feng, Zhang, Wu, Ma, T. B. Yang, Li & Z. Z. Yang, 2016 – China
P. clavis Bayer, 2012 – Taiwan
P. conicus Feng, Zhang, Wu, Ma, T. B. Yang, Li & Z. Z. Yang, 2016 – China
P. crepido Bayer, 2012 – India
P. decollatus Bayer, 2012 – Indonesia (Java)
P. demiror Bayer, 2012 – Vietnam, Cambodia, and/or Laos
P. discoideus Feng, Zhang, Wu, Ma, T. B. Yang, Li & Z. Z. Yang, 2016 – China
P. elachys Bayer, 2012 – Thailand
P. fuscai Bayer, 2012 – China
P. ghecuanus Thorell, 1897 – Myanmar, Thailand, Laos, China
P. hartmanni Bayer, 2012 – Sri Lanka
P. himalayanus Simon, 1906 – India, Nepal, Bhutan
P. huberi Bayer, 2014 – Philippines
P. inflatus Bayer, 2012 – India, China
P. insulanus Bayer, 2014 – Thailand
P. jaegeri Bayer, 2012 – Thailand, Laos
P. jinggangensis Wang & Yin, 2001 – China
P. kenting Yoshida, 2009 – Taiwan
P. khammouan Jäger, 2007 – Laos
P. kinabalu Levi, 1982 – Borneo
P. kunmingensis Yin, Wang & Zhang, 1985 – China
P. laos Bayer, 2012 – Laos
P. libelti Kulczyński, 1908 – Thailand to Indonesia (Borneo)
P. luangprabang Jäger, 2007 – Laos
P. marsyandi Levi, 1982 – Nepal
P. mulu Levi, 1982 – Borneo
P. norops Bayer, 2012 – Malaysia
P. obtectus Bayer, 2012 – Vietnam
P. omistes Bayer, 2014 – Indonesia (Sumatra)
P. pakawini Bayer, 2012 – Myanmar, Thailand
P. quasillus Bayer, 2014 – Borneo
P. rani Wang & Yin, 2001 – China, Vietnam
P. schwendingeri Bayer, 2012 – Philippines
P. senoculatus Yin, Wang & Zhang, 1985 – China
P. sinensis [[Lucien Berland|Berland]] & [[Lucien Berland|Berland]], 1914 – China
P. singaporensis Thorell, 1894 – Malaysia, Singapore, Indonesia (Sumatra)
P. spatulatus Feng, Zhang, Wu, Ma, T. B. Yang, Li & Z. Z. Yang, 2016 – China
P. steineri Bayer & Jäger, 2010 – Laos
P. taiwanensis Wang & Yin, 2001 – Taiwan
P. tauricornis Bayer, 2012 – Sri Lanka
P. tingpingensis Yin, Wang & Zhang, 1985 – China
P. torvus (O. Pickard-Cambridge, 1869) – Sri Lanka, India
P. triangulus Yang, Zhang, Zhu & Song, 2003 – China
P. ulcus Bayer, 2012 – Borneo
P. vivax Bayer, 2012 – Thailand
P. wade Bayer, 2014 – Philippines
P. zygon Bayer, 2012 – Sri Lanka

See also
 List of Psechridae species

References

Araneomorphae genera
Psechridae
Spiders of Asia
Spiders of Australia
Taxa named by Tamerlan Thorell